Agrionympha is a genus of small primitive metallic moths in the family Micropterigidae, and the sole genus of the family known to occur in southern Africa.

Species
Agrionympha capensis Whalley, 1978 
Agrionympha fuscoapicella Gibbs, 2011
Agrionympha jansella Gibbs, 2011
Agrionympha karoo Gibbs, 2011
Agrionympha kroonella Gibbs, 2011
Agrionympha pseliacma Meyrick, 1921 
Agrionympha pseudovari Gibbs, 2011
Agrionympha sagittella Gibbs, 2011
Agrionympha vari Whalley, 1978

References

Micropterigidae
Moth genera
Taxa named by Edward Meyrick